Alberto Sánchez Escobar (born 2 February 1973 in Santiago de Cuba) is a retired Cuban hammer thrower, whose personal best throw is 77.78 metres, which he achieved in May 1998 in Havana. He competed twice at the World Championships without reaching the final; in 1993 and 1995. He competed at the 1996 Summer Olympics.

He competed as a guest athlete in the under-20 section of the 
Central American and Caribbean Junior Championships in Havana and placed third in 56.40 m, behind the two selected Cuban throwers.

International competition record

References

External links

1973 births
Living people
Cuban male hammer throwers
Athletes (track and field) at the 1995 Pan American Games
Athletes (track and field) at the 2003 Pan American Games
Athletes (track and field) at the 1996 Summer Olympics
Olympic athletes of Cuba
Sportspeople from Santiago de Cuba
Pan American Games medalists in athletics (track and field)
Pan American Games silver medalists for Cuba
Competitors at the 1993 Central American and Caribbean Games
Competitors at the 1998 Central American and Caribbean Games
Central American and Caribbean Games gold medalists for Cuba
Central American and Caribbean Games medalists in athletics
Medalists at the 1995 Pan American Games
20th-century Cuban people